Streptomyces amritsarensis is a bacterium species from the genus Streptomyces which has been isolated from soil from Punjab in India. Streptomyces amritsarensis has antimicrobial activity.

See also 
 List of Streptomyces species

References

Further reading 
 

amritsarensis
Bacteria described in 2014